Niceforonia nigrovittata is a species of frog in the family Strabomantidae found in Colombia, Ecuador, Peru, and possibly Brazil.
Its natural habitats are subtropical or tropical moist lowland forests and heavily degraded former forests.

References

nigrovittata
Amphibians of Colombia
Amphibians of Ecuador
Amphibians of Peru
Taxonomy articles created by Polbot
Amphibians described in 1945